Luis Alberto Lacalle de Herrera, GCMG (Lacalle locally  or ; born 13 July 1941), is a Uruguayan politician and lawyer who served as President of Uruguay from 1990 to 1995.

Background
His mother, María Hortensia de Herrera de Lacalle, was the daughter of the White political leader Luis Alberto de Herrera, after whom Lacalle was named. Luis Alberto Lacalle joined the National Party at the age of 17. In 1961 he started working as a journalist for Clarín and he graduated from the University of the Republic's law school in 1964. In 1971, he was elected deputy for Montevideo and kept his seat until the 1973 coup, when President Juan María Bordaberry dissolved parliament.

Assassination attempt
In August 1978 Lacalle was sent three bottles of wine tainted with poison  addressed to himself and two fellow National Party members (Heber and Pereyra) who had been trying to negotiate a way out of the military regime. Lacalle's wife warned him against the suspicious gift, but Heber's wife drank a glass, dying immediately. The case remains unsolved.

Vice-President of Senate
When democracy was restored in 1984 he was elected senator, and became vice-president of the Senate.

President of Uruguay

1989 election
In 1989 he ran for the presidency for his faction, Herrerismo, with running-mate Gonzalo Aguirre. In the subsequent elections in November 1989, the National Party defeated the rival Colorado Party (running with several presidential candidates: Jorge Batlle, Jorge Pacheco Areco and Hugo Fernández Faingold) and Broad Front (running with presidential candidate Líber Seregni). Lacalle received the most votes within his party, defeating Carlos Julio Pereyra and Alberto Zumarán, and thus was elected President of Uruguay, taking office on March 1, 1990 for a five-year term.

Tenure
Upon taking office, Lacalle sent parliament a tax reform bill which was immediately passed with the support of the Colorado Party. Sales tax were increased from 21% to 22%  income tax was increased and a few other taxes were created.  During his rule, he encouraged a free market program, participated in the Brady bonds plan to alleviate foreign debt obligations, and was a co-founder of the Mercosur, along with the presidents of Paraguay, Brazil, and Argentina, which came into effect with the Treaty of Asunción in 1991.

In 1992, support for his economic reforms suffered a heavy blow when one of his most significant initiatives, a plan to privatize Uruguay's state-owned companies, was rejected by referendum.

In the 1994 national elections, he selected his Interior Minister, Juan Andrés Ramírez to be the presidential candidate of the Herrerismo faction. The National Party narrowly lost the elections to the Colorado Party.

Among several prominent politicians who took part in his government are Héctor Gros Espiell, Sergio Abreu, Juan Andrés Ramírez, Carlos Cat and Ignacio de Posadas.

Later runs for the presidency
In 1999, he won his party's primary elections against Juan Andrés Ramírez (who had split from the Herrerismo) and several other candidates, and was a candidate for presidency again. However, a string of accusations about corruption in his government damaged his chances. Ramírez's departure from active politics after losing the primary was the final blow, and Lacalle came in third place with 22.3% of the votes in the general elections.

Lacalle ran again for president in the 2004 elections, but the other party leaders had gathered around a single opposing candidate, Jorge Larrañaga, who defeated him in the primaries by a 2-to-1 margin. In 2009, he ran for the presidency again, this time defeating Jorge Larrañaga in the June primaries. By winning the primary election, he became head of the governing board of the party. He lost the presidential elections to José Mujica in a run-off election in November.

Lacalle is a member of the Club de Madrid. and he is member of the board of the Public Affairs Committee of the Jerusalem Summit.

Family
Lacalle is married to María Julia Pou Brito del Pino (born 1946); they have four children, Pilar Lacalle Pou, President Luis Alberto Lacalle Pou, economist Juan José Lacalle Pou and Manuel Lacalle Pou. Luis Alberto Lacalle Pou was the 2014 presidential candidate of the National Party and once again in 2019. On both occasions, he entered the second round but in 2019 he won, and became president elect of Uruguay, for the 2020–2025 term.

Honors
 Israel: Honorary degree, Hebrew University of Jerusalem
 Mexico: Honorary degree, Autonomous University of Guadalajara
 Paraguay: Honorary degree, National University of Asunción
 Spain: Honorary degree, Complutense University of Madrid
 United Kingdom: Knight Grand Cross of the Order of St Michael and St George

See also
 Politics of Uruguay
 List of political families#Uruguay

References

External links
Biography by CIDOB Foundation (in Spanish)
 Senador Luis Alberto Lacalle Herrera

1941 births
Living people
 
People from Montevideo
Presidents of Uruguay
Uruguayan people of Spanish descent
Uruguayan people of Basque descent
University of the Republic (Uruguay) alumni
20th-century Uruguayan lawyers
National Party (Uruguay) politicians
Knights Grand Cross of the Order of St Michael and St George
Recipients of the Medal of Military Merit (Uruguay)